General elections were held in Vanuatu on 2 November 1983, the first since independence from France and the United Kingdom (which had governed it as a Condominium) in 1980. The ruling Vanua'aku Pati won 24 seats, while the Union of Moderate Parties won 12. Walter Lini of the Vanua'aku Pati remained Prime Minister. Voter turnout was 74.9%.

Electoral system
Most members were elected through single non-transferable voting in multi-seat districts having two to five members each. One member (the member for Epi) was elected through first past the post.

Results

See also
List of members of the Parliament of Vanuatu (1983–1987)

References

Vanuatu
General
Elections in Vanuatu
Vanuatu